Tatu Chionga (born 1 March 1944) is a Malawian boxer. He competed in the men's lightweight event at the 1972 Summer Olympics.

References

External links
 

1944 births
Living people
Malawian male boxers
Olympic boxers of Malawi
Boxers at the 1972 Summer Olympics
Place of birth missing (living people)
Lightweight boxers
Commonwealth Games medallists in boxing
Commonwealth Games bronze medallists for Malawi
Boxers at the 1970 British Commonwealth Games
Medallists at the 1970 British Commonwealth Games